Flavius Marion Gibson Sr. (February 12, 1867 – April 6, 1922) was a Texas legislator who served in the Texas Senate for district 3 representing Fannin County and Bonham County. He was a member of the Democratic Party.

Personal life
Flavius Marion Gibson was born in Virginia on February 12, 1867. At the age of two, Gibson and his family moved to Texas. He was a teacher and was a superintendent for a public school, he also practiced law. He died on April 6, 1922, at the age of 55, in his home in Bonham, Texas following a ten day long illness. His final resting place is Wild Willow Cemetery in Bonham, Texas.

Political career
Gibson served in the Texas Senate for district 3 from 1913 to 1921, he also served as president protempore two times, however, one of those times was only at the end of session. He represented Fannin County and Lamar County. He was a member of the Democratic Party.

References

1867 births
1922 deaths
20th-century American politicians